Merrill Merchants Bank was a bank based in Bangor, Maine, United States. It was founded in 1992 as a Maine-based institution which sought "to return local control to Bangor banking." William C. Bullock Jr. led the bank from its founding until his retirement in 2004. Leonard Minsky served as the bank's founding director. In 2008, it was acquired by People's United Bank. It was established with 75 employees, 7 branches, and $74 million in assets.

References

American companies established in 1992
Banks established in 1992
Banks based in Maine
Companies based in Bangor, Maine
1992 establishments in Maine
2009 mergers and acquisitions